Leif Håkan Nordin (born January 15, 1961) is an ice hockey player who played for the Swedish national team. Nordin was drafted 36th overall in the 1981 NHL Entry Draft by the St. Louis Blues but never played in North America. He won a bronze medal at the 1984 Winter Olympics.

Career statistics

Regular season and playoffs

International

References 

1961 births
Living people
Ice hockey players at the 1984 Winter Olympics
Olympic bronze medalists for Sweden
Olympic ice hockey players of Sweden
St. Louis Blues draft picks
Swedish ice hockey players
Olympic medalists in ice hockey
Medalists at the 1984 Winter Olympics